Tetragnatha pallescens is a species of long-jawed orb weaver in the spider family Tetragnathidae. It is found in North, Central America, and the Caribbean Sea.

References

Tetragnathidae
Articles created by Qbugbot
Spiders described in 1903
Spiders of North America
Spiders of Central America
Spiders of South America